Hur (also Romanized as Ḩūr and Howr; also known as Haur) is a village in Heruz Rural District, Kuhsaran District, Ravar County, Kerman Province, Iran. At the 2006 census, its population was 273, in 73 families.

References 

Populated places in Ravar County